George Eric McCarthy Marthins  (24 December 1905 – 23 March 1989) was an Indian field hockey player who competed in the 1928 Summer Olympics as a member of the Indian field hockey team, which won the gold medal.

He studied at St. George's College, Mussoorie, India, which produced six Olympic hockey players (Earnest Goodsir-Cullen, William Goodsir-Cullen, Michael Gateley, Lionel Emmett, Carlyle Tapsell and Marthins himself).

References

External links
 
 

1905 births
1989 deaths
Field hockey players from Chennai
Field hockey players from Tamil Nadu
Olympic field hockey players of India
Anglo-Indian people
Field hockey players at the 1928 Summer Olympics
Indian male field hockey players
Olympic gold medalists for India
Olympic medalists in field hockey
Medalists at the 1928 Summer Olympics
Indian emigrants to Canada
Canadian people of Anglo-Indian descent